Shanxi Lu'an Environmental Energy is a Chinese company engaged in the mining, processing, and distribution of coal. Chiefly, the company produces for sale coke and refined coal.

History 
Shanxi Lu'an Environmental Energy was founded on July 19, 2001.

The company was listed on the Shanghai Stock exchange on September 22, 2006 as ticker 601699.

October 2020 mine accident 
On October 20, a gas explosion at a coal mine in Shanxi operated by Shanxi Lu'an Environmental Energy occurred, killing four people and injuring an additional person.

References

Coal companies of China
Companies based in Shanxi
Changzhi
Companies listed on the Shanghai Stock Exchange